Ulaş (Kurdish:Tecer) is a town and a district of Sivas Province of Turkey. The mayor is Hüseyin Gülkanat (CHP).

References

Populated places in Sivas Province
Districts of Sivas Province